The Jerwen County ( or ,  or) was one of the four counties of the Russian Empire located in the Governorate of Estonia. It was situated in the central part of the governorate (in present-day northern Estonia). Its capital was Paide (Weissenstein). The territory of Kreis Jerwen corresponds to most of the present-day Järva County and small parts of Lääne-Viru and Rapla counties.

Demographics
At the time of the Russian Empire Census of 1897, Kreis Jerwen had a population of 52,673. Of these, 96.7% spoke Estonian, 2.2% German, 0.8% Russian, 0.1% Yiddish and 0.1% Latvian as their native language.

References

Jerwen
Uezds of Estland Governorate